Alex Ishchenko (born 20 April 1964) is a former Australian rules footballer who played for the West Coast Eagles, Brisbane Bears and North Melbourne Football Club in the Australian Football League (VFL/AFL).

A ruckman, Ishchenko was born in Perth W.A. and made his VFL debut in 1987 with the inaugural West Coast side. After two seasons at the club he moved to Brisbane and played with the Bears before finishing his career at North Melbourne. He is a part-time ruck coach for North Melbourne in the AFL.

External links

1964 births
Living people
Australian rules footballers from Western Australia
Australian people of Ukrainian descent
West Coast Eagles players
Brisbane Bears players
North Melbourne Football Club players
East Perth Football Club players
Western Australian State of Origin players